Soumya Sadanandan is an Indian filmmaker and actor who works in Malayalam Film Industry. She was popular as the Television Host of a film based show in Kappa TV, called 'Film Lounge' (2013–2017). She was a member of the Jury and Selection Committee of IFFK 2017 and IDSFFK 2021.

Early life
She was born at Mepallikutti, Alappuzha, Kerala. She completed her schooling from Kendriya Vidyalaya Pattom and secured a degree in Electrical and Electronics Engineering from College Of Engineering Thiruvananthapuram , Kerala.

Filmography
As Director / Producer

As Artist

Awards 
 2016 Chembai: My discovery of a legend - Special Jury Award for Best Documentary at the 64th National Film Awards. 

 2016 Chembai : My discovery of a legend - Best Documentary at Allahabad International film festival.

References

External links 

1985 births
Living people
Malayalam film directors
People from Kerala
Actresses in Malayalam cinema
Actresses in Tamil cinema